Ila Patnaik is an Indian economist. and former Principal Economic Advisor to the Government of India. During this time, she prepared the Economic Survey of India, 2013-14 and contributed to numerous Government of India committees and task forces. In 2014, she was the only female economist ranked within the top ten in India, along with the likes of Nobel Laureate Amartya Sen and former RBI governors Y V Reddy, Raghuram Rajan and Urjit Patel. She also writes regular columns for The Indian Express.

She is currently a professor at the National Institute of Public Finance and Policy (NIPFP).

Education 
Ila Patnaik has a Bachelor of Arts degree in Economics, from Hindu College, University of Delhi (1985). She got her Master's in Economics, along with a Master's in Philosophy from the Centre of Economic Studies and Planning, Jawaharlal Nehru University (1987 and 1989). While she pursued her undergraduate and graduate studies in India, she decided to pursue her Ph.D in the United Kingdom, and she graduated with a Ph.D in Economics, from University of Surrey in 1996.

Career
Ila Patnaik was an Economics Editor, The Indian Express. She wrote a Fortnightly column in Business Standard. She also worked as Editor, Macro Track, A Quarterly Update on the Indian Economy, NCAER, New Delhi, 1997-2001. Furthermore, Patnaik also was a Senior Economist and a Senior Fellow for National Council of Applied Economic Research (NCAER) and Indian Council for Research in International Economic Relations (1996 - 2002, 2004; 2002 - 2004 respectively). She did a program on NDTV, Policy with Patnaik from 2007 to 2009. And now she is working in ThePrint on weekly shows regarding Indian Economy.

Research Areas and Publications 
Ila Patnaik's main research area is open economy macroeconomics. She has done research in many areas including issues related to capital flows, exchange rate regime, monetary policy, business cycles, and the financial sector (in the context of opening of the capital account). Patnaik has published various papers, books, encyclopedias, and journal articles. Some of her most recent papers and publications include:

 "Ila Patnaik Radhika Pandey, Gurnain K. Pasricha and Ajay Shah. 'Motivations for capital controls and their effectiveness.''' Working paper 168, National Institute of Public Finance & Policy, April 2016";
 "Ila Patnaik Rudrani Bhattacharya, Radhika Pandey and Ajay Shah. 'Seasonal adjustment of Indian macroeconomic time-series. Working Paper 160, National Institute of Public Finance & Policy, January 2016";
 "Ila Patnaik and Ajay Shah. 'Measurement of de-facto exchange rate regimes.''' 2014";
 "Rudrani Bhattacharya and Ila Patnaik. 'Forecasting and monetary policy analysis in emerging economies: The case of India. Working Paper 131, National Institute of Public Finance & Policy, February 2014", etc.

Awards 
Among the multiple awards given to Patnaik are "Junior Science Talent Scholarship" (1978), "National Talent Search Scholarship" (1980), "Junior Research Fellowship for Economics" (1987), and "British Nehru Centenary Fellowship for Doctoral study in Economics in the UK" (1991).

References

External links
 Profile
 

20th-century Indian economists
Living people
People from New Delhi
Hindu College, Delhi alumni
Jawaharlal Nehru University alumni
Alumni of the University of Surrey
Indian business and financial journalists
Indian women economists
Scientists from Delhi
21st-century Indian economists
Women scientists from Delhi
21st-century Indian women scientists
20th-century Indian women scientists
Educators from Delhi
Women educators from Delhi
Women business and financial journalists
Year of birth missing (living people)